UFOs Declassified is a Canadian television series that premiered on January 9, 2015 on the History Canada channel. Produced by Company X Studios, the program features declassified CIA and US Air Force documents pertaining to notable UFO reports.

Production
The show was created and produced by Wayne Abbott and John Moores. UFOlogists Nick Pope, Leslie Kean, Ben Hansen and Donald Schmitt appear in the first season of the series.

Series overview

Season 1 (2015)

References

External links

2015 Canadian television series debuts
2015 Canadian television series endings
2010s Canadian reality television series
Paranormal television
UFO-related television